Garforth is a surname. Notable people with the surname include:

Andrew Garforth (born 1963), Australian murderer
Charles Ernest Garforth (1891–1973), Recipient of the Victoria Cross
Darren Garforth (born 1966), English rugby player
William Garforth (1855–1931), English cricketer and soldier
Danny Garforth (born 1985),